Hunter Hudson Kimball (July 14, 1893 – May 29, 1972) was a college football player and the first Executive Director of the Mississippi Game and Fish Commission.

Mississippi State
Kimball was a prominent running back  for the Mississippi A & M Aggies of Mississippi A & M University. His playing in the 1911 Egg Bowl, then his position was at end, was cited as 'superb' by the Commercial Appeal. That year Mississippi A & M was invited to its first postseason bowl game, the Bacardi Bowl in Havana, Cuba. He received the most votes of any All-Southern halfback in 1914. He was nominated though not selected for an Associated Press All-Time Southeast 1869-1919 era team.

Fish and Game Commission
He was the first Executive Director of the Mississippi Game and Fish Commission, appointed to the position in 1932.

Family life
His son Hunter, Jr. was a casualty of the Korean War.

References

1893 births
1972 deaths
Players of American football from Jackson, Mississippi
American football ends
American football halfbacks
Mississippi State Bulldogs football players
All-Southern college football players
American conservationists